Miss Chinese International Pageant 2008 was held on January 26, 2008 in Foshan, China, for the second consecutive year. The pageant was organized and broadcast by TVB in Hong Kong.  Miss Chinese International 2007 Sarah Song of Sydney, Australia crowned Océane Zhu of Paris, France as the 20th Miss Chinese International. Zhu is the first ever winner from Europe.

Pageant information
The slogan to this year's pageant was "Expanding the View of the World: Beauty Comes from the Chinese " 「放眼世界 美麗來自中華」.  The Masters of Ceremonies include Eric Tsang, Sammy Leung and Myolie Wu.  Special performing guest was cantopop singer Kenny Chung. 
Contestant #23 TingJia Rosalinda Lorigiano of Montreal was the youngest of all competitors in the history of the pageant, at 17 years old. Her younger sister, Lucia Lorigiano 黄婷麗, later competed and won the title of Miss Chinese Montreal and competed in Miss Chinese International Pageant 2014 and won 2nd Runner-Up.

Top 10 mishap
While the MCs were announcing the top 10 semi-finalists, there was a notable pause and indistinct discussion among them after the third delegate was called out.  Eric Tsang then said an error was made in announcing one of the semi-finalists, but did not state whom.  After the initial 10 delegates were revealed, Sammy Leung announced that (20) Ivy Han was among the semi-finalist list as well, causing the list to grow to eleven semi-finalists.  Immediately afterwards, the reasoning for this was backtracked and the MCs stated that the extra semi-finalist was due to scoring issues and a tie for 10th place.  After the pageant, it was revealed that the mix-up occurred because the scoring tie was not communicated to the MCs, hence they were hesitant to announce all eleven semi-finalists.

Results

Special awards
Miss Friendship: Delaine Lee 李德玲 (Calgary)
Miss Courageous: Lisa Li 李莎 (Auckland)
Miss Young: Océane Zhu 朱璇 (Paris)

Contestant list

Crossovers
Contestants who previously competed or will be competing at other international beauty pageants:

Miss World
 2007: : Kayi Cheung (Top 16)

References

External links
 Miss Chinese International Pageant 2008 Official Site

TVB
2008 beauty pageants
2008 in China
Beauty pageants in China
Miss Chinese International Pageants